Khunik-e Pain (also Romanized as Khūnīk-e Pā’īn; also known as Khūnīk, Khonik Sofla, Khūng Soflá, and Khūnīk-e Soflá) is a village in Neh Rural District, in the Central District of Nehbandan County, South Khorasan Province, Iran. At the 2006 census, its population was 215, in 65 families.

References 

Populated places in Nehbandan County